The Coast Conference is a college athletic conference that is affiliated with the California Community College Athletic Association.  Its members are primarily based in the Southern San Francisco Bay Area region.

Members 
The league currently has 17 full members:

External links
 Coast Conference home page

CCCAA conferences